Pilaria is a genus of crane flies in the family Limoniidae.

Species
P. albopostica Alexander, 1974
P. alboposticata Alexander, 1931
P. amica (Alexander, 1915)
P. arguta Alexander, 1929
P. brevitarsis Alexander, 1956
P. brevivena Alexander, 1956
P. brooksi Alexander, 1953
P. carbonipes Alexander, 1931
P. chionomera Alexander, 1956
P. chionopoda Alexander, 1972
P. coorgensis Alexander, 1963
P. decolor (Zetterstedt, 1851)
P. discicollis (Meigen, 1818)
P. dorsalis Alexander, 1924
P. flava (Garrett, 1925)
P. formosicola Alexander, 1929
P. fuscipennis (Meigen, 1818)
P. harrisoni Alexander, 1936
P. hypermeca Alexander, 1970
P. imbecilla (Osten Sacken, 1860)
P. melanota Alexander, 1922
P. meridiana (Staeger, 1840)
P. microcera Alexander, 1924
P. nigropunctata (Agrell, 1945)
P. perelongata Alexander, 1976
P. phaeonota Alexander, 1943
P. quadrata (Osten Sacken, 1860)
P. recondita (Osten Sacken, 1869)
P. rubella Alexander, 1926
P. scutellata (Staeger, 1840)
P. simulans Savchenko, 1983
P. sordidipes Alexander, 1972
P. stanwoodae (Alexander, 1914)
P. subalbipes Alexander, 1956
P. tenuipes (Say, 1823)
P. tiro Alexander, 1972
P. tokionis (Alexander, 1920)
P. vermontana Alexander, 1929

References

External links

Limoniidae
Tipuloidea genera